The 69th United States Congress was a meeting of the legislative branch of the United States federal government, consisting of the United States Senate and the United States House of Representatives. It met in Washington, D.C. from March 4, 1925, to March 4, 1927, during the third and fourth years of Calvin Coolidge's presidency. The apportionment of seats in the House of Representatives was based on the 1910 United States census.

The Republicans made modest gains in maintaining their majority in both chambers, and with the election of President Calvin Coolidge to his own term in office, the Republicans maintained an overall federal government trifecta.

Major events

A special session of the Senate was called by President Coolidge on February 14, 1925.
 Impeachment of Judge George W. English — On April 1, 1926, the House of Representatives impeached Judge George W. English of the United States District Court for the Eastern District of Illinois. Both Houses adjourned on July 3, 1926, with the Senate scheduled to reconvene on November 10, 1926, as a Court of Impeachment. English resigned before the impeachment trial began. The Senate met as planned on November 10, 1926, to adjourn the court of impeachment sine die. On December 13, 1926, the Senate, acting on advice from the House managers of the impeachment, formally dismissed all charges against Judge English.
 January 17, 1927: U.S. Supreme Court held (McGrain v. Daugherty) that Congress has the power to compel witness and testimony.

Major legislation

 February 26, 1926: Revenue Act of 1926
 April 12, 1926: Timber Exportation Act of 1926
 May 8, 1926: Federal Interpleader Act of 1926
 May 20, 1926: Air Commerce Act
 May 20, 1926: Federal Black Bass Act of 1926
 May 20, 1926: Railway Labor Act (Parker-Watson Act)
 May 25, 1926: Omnibus Adjustment Act of 1926
 May 25, 1926: Public Buildings Act of 1926 (Elliot-Fernald Act)
 May 26, 1926: Shenandoah National Park Act of 1926
 June 3, 1926: Subsistence Expense Act of 1926
 June 14, 1926: Recreation and Public Purposes Act
 June 15, 1926: Limitation of National Forest Designation Act
 July 2, 1926: Cooperative Marketing Act
 July 3, 1926: Walsh Act
 July 3, 1926: Passport Act of 1926
 January 21, 1927: River and Harbors Act of 1927
 February 23, 1927: Radio Act of 1927 (Dill-White Act)
 February 25, 1927: McFadden Act (Pepper-McFadden Act)
 March 3, 1927: Foreign and Domestic Commerce Act of 1927
 March 3, 1927: Produce Agency Act of 1927
 March 4, 1927: Mayfield-Newton Act

Party summary

The count below identifies party affiliations at the beginning of the first session of this Congress, and includes members from vacancies and newly admitted states, when they were first seated. Changes resulting from subsequent replacements are shown below in the "Changes in membership" section.

Senate

House of Representatives

Leadership

Senate 

 President: Charles G. Dawes (R)
 President pro tempore: Albert B. Cummins (R), elected March 4, 1925
 George H. Moses (R), elected March 6, 1925

Majority (Republican) leadership 
 Majority Leader: Charles Curtis
 Majority Whip: Wesley L. Jones
 Republican Conference Secretary: James Wolcott Wadsworth Jr.
 National Senatorial Committee Chair: Lawrence C. Phipps

Minority (Democratic) leadership 
 Minority Leader: Joseph T. Robinson
 Minority Whip: Peter G. Gerry
 Democratic Caucus Secretary: William H. King

House of Representatives 

 Speaker: Nicholas Longworth (R)

Majority (Republican) leadership 
 Majority Leader: John Q. Tilson
 Majority Whip: Albert H. Vestal
 Republican Conference Chairman: Willis C. Hawley
 Republican Campaign Committee Chairman: William R. Wood

Minority (Democratic) leadership 
 Minority Leader: Finis J. Garrett
 Minority Whip: William Allan Oldfield
 Democratic Caucus Chairman: Charles D. Carter

Members
This list is arranged by chamber, then by state. Senators are listed by class, and representatives by district.

Senate
Senators were elected every two years, with one-third beginning new six-year terms with each Congress. Preceding the names in the list below are Senate class numbers, which indicate the cycle of their election. In this Congress, Class 1 meant their term began in the last Congress, facing re-election in 1928; Class 2 meant their term began with this Congress, facing re-election in 1930; and Class 3 meant their term ended with this Congress, facing re-election in 1926.

Alabama 
 2. J. Thomas Heflin (D)
 3. Oscar Underwood (D)

Arizona 
 1. Henry F. Ashurst (D)
 3. Ralph H. Cameron (R)

Arkansas 
 2. Joseph T. Robinson (D)
 3. Thaddeus H. Caraway (D)

California 
 1. Hiram Johnson (R)
 3. Samuel M. Shortridge (R)

Colorado 
 2. Lawrence C. Phipps (R)
 3. Rice W. Means (R)

Connecticut 
 1. George P. McLean (R)
 3. Hiram Bingham III (R)

Delaware 
 1. Thomas F. Bayard Jr. (D)
 2. T. Coleman du Pont (R)

Florida 
 1. Park Trammell (D)
 3. Duncan U. Fletcher (D)

Georgia 
 2. William J. Harris (D)
 3. Walter F. George (D)

Idaho 
 2. William E. Borah (R)
 3. Frank R. Gooding (R)

Illinois 
 2. Charles S. Deneen (R)
 3. William B. McKinley (R), until December 7, 1926

Indiana 
 1. Samuel M. Ralston (D), until October 14, 1925
 Arthur R. Robinson (R), from October 20, 1925
 3. James E. Watson (R)

Iowa 
 2. Smith W. Brookhart (R), until April 12, 1926
 Daniel F. Steck (D), from April 12, 1926
 3. Albert B. Cummins (R), until July 30, 1926
 David W. Stewart (R), from August 7, 1926

Kansas 
 2. Arthur Capper (R)
 3. Charles Curtis (R)

Kentucky 
 2. Frederic M. Sackett (R)
 3. Richard P. Ernst (R)

Louisiana 
 2. Joseph E. Ransdell (D)
 3. Edwin S. Broussard (D)

Maine 
 1. Frederick Hale (R)
 2. Bert M. Fernald (R), until August 23, 1926
 Arthur R. Gould (R), from November 30, 1926

Maryland 
 1. William Cabell Bruce (D)
 3. Ovington Weller (R)

Massachusetts 
 1. William M. Butler (R), until December 6, 1926
 David I. Walsh (D), from December 6, 1926
 2. Frederick H. Gillett (R)

Michigan 
 1. Woodbridge N. Ferris (D)
 2. James J. Couzens (R)

Minnesota 
 1. Henrik Shipstead (FL)
 2. Thomas D. Schall (R)

Mississippi 
 1. Hubert D. Stephens (D)
 2. Pat Harrison (D)

Missouri 
 1. James A. Reed (D)
 3. Selden P. Spencer (R), until May 16, 1925
 George H. Williams (R), May 25, 1925 – December 6, 1926
 Harry B. Hawes (D), from December 6, 1926

Montana 
 1. Burton K. Wheeler (D)
 2. Thomas J. Walsh (D)

Nebraska 
 1. Robert B. Howell (R)
 2. George W. Norris (R)

Nevada 
 1. Key Pittman (D)
 3. Tasker Oddie (R)

New Hampshire 
 2. Henry W. Keyes (R)
 3. George H. Moses (R)

New Jersey 
 1. Edward I. Edwards (D)
 2. Walter E. Edge (R)

New Mexico 
 1. Andrieus A. Jones (D)
 2. Sam G. Bratton (D)

New York 
 1. Royal S. Copeland (D)
 3. James W. Wadsworth Jr. (R)

North Carolina 
 2. Furnifold M. Simmons (D)
 3. Lee S. Overman (D)

North Dakota 
 1. Lynn Frazier (R-NPL)
 3. Edwin F. Ladd (R), until June 22, 1925
 Gerald Nye (R), from November 14, 1925

Ohio 
 1. Simeon D. Fess (R)
 3. Frank B. Willis (R)

Oklahoma 
 2. William B. Pine (R)
 3. John W. Harreld (R)

Oregon 
 2. Charles L. McNary (R)
 3. Robert N. Stanfield (R)

Pennsylvania 
 1. David A. Reed (R)
 3. George Wharton Pepper (R)

Rhode Island 
 1. Peter G. Gerry (D)
 2. Jesse H. Metcalf (R)

South Carolina 
 2. Coleman L. Blease (D)
 3. Ellison D. Smith (D)

South Dakota 
 2. William H. McMaster (R)
 3. Peter Norbeck (R)

Tennessee 
 1. Kenneth McKellar (D)
 2. Lawrence Tyson (D)

Texas 
 1. Earle B. Mayfield (D)
 2. Morris Sheppard (D)

Utah 
 1. William H. King (D)
 3. Reed Smoot (R)

Vermont 
 1. Frank L. Greene (R)
 3. Porter H. Dale (R)

Virginia 
 1. Claude A. Swanson (D)
 2. Carter Glass (D)

Washington 
 1. Clarence Dill (D)
 3. Wesley L. Jones (R)

West Virginia 
 1. Guy D. Goff (R)
 2. Matthew M. Neely (D)

Wisconsin 
 1. Robert M. La Follette Sr. (R), until June 18, 1925
 Robert M. La Follette Jr. (R), from September 30, 1925
 3. Irvine Lenroot (R)

Wyoming 
 1. John B. Kendrick (D)
 2. Francis E. Warren (R)

House of Representatives

Alabama 
 . John McDuffie (D)
 . J. Lister Hill (D)
 . Henry B. Steagall (D)
 . Lamar Jeffers (D)
 . William B. Bowling (D)
 . William B. Oliver (D)
 . Miles C. Allgood (D)
 . Edward B. Almon (D)
 . George Huddleston (D)
 . William B. Bankhead (D)

Arizona 
 . Carl Hayden (D)

Arkansas 
 . William J. Driver (D)
 . William A. Oldfield (D)
 . John N. Tillman (D)
 . Otis Wingo (D)
 . Heartsill Ragon (D)
 . James B. Reed (D)
 . Tilman B. Parks (D)

California 
 . Clarence F. Lea (D)
 . John E. Raker (D), until January 22, 1926
 Harry L. Englebright (R), from August 31, 1926
 . Charles F. Curry (R)
 . Florence P. Kahn (R)
 . Lawrence J. Flaherty (R), until June 13, 1926
 Richard J. Welch (R), from August 31, 1926
 . Albert E. Carter (R)
 . Henry E. Barbour (R)
 . Arthur M. Free (R)
 . Walter F. Lineberger (R)
 . John D. Fredericks (R)
 . Phil Swing (R)

Colorado 
 . William N. Vaile (R)
 . Charles B. Timberlake (R)
 . Guy U. Hardy (R)
 . Edward T. Taylor (D)

Connecticut 
 . E. Hart Fenn (R)
 . Richard P. Freeman (R)
 . John Q. Tilson (R)
 . Schuyler Merritt (R)
 . James P. Glynn (R)

Delaware 
 . Robert G. Houston (R)

Florida 
 . Herbert J. Drane (D)
 . Robert A. Green (D)
 . John H. Smithwick (D)
 . William J. Sears (D)

Georgia 
 . Charles G. Edwards (D)
 . Edward E. Cox (D)
 . Charles R. Crisp (D)
 . William C. Wright (D)
 . William D. Upshaw (D)
 . Samuel Rutherford (D)
 . Gordon Lee (D)
 . Charles H. Brand (D)
 . Thomas M. Bell (D)
 . Carl Vinson (D)
 . William C. Lankford (D)
 . William W. Larsen (D)

Idaho 
 . Burton L. French (R)
 . Addison T. Smith (R)

Illinois 
 . Henry R. Rathbone (R)
 . Richard Yates (R)
 . Martin B. Madden (R)
 . Morton D. Hull (R)
 . Elliott W. Sproul (R)
 . Thomas A. Doyle (D)
 . Adolph J. Sabath (D)
 . John J. Gorman (R)
 . M. Alfred Michaelson (R)
 . Stanley H. Kunz (D)
 . Frederick A. Britten (R)
 . Carl R. Chindblom (R)
 . Frank R. Reid (R)
 . Charles E. Fuller (R), until June 25, 1926
 . William R. Johnson (R)
 . John C. Allen (R)
 . Edward J. King (R)
 . William E. Hull (R)
 . Frank H. Funk (R)
 . William P. Holaday (R)
 . Charles Adkins (R)
 . Henry T. Rainey (D)
 . Loren E. Wheeler (R)
 . Edward M. Irwin (R)
 . William W. Arnold (D)
 . Thomas S. Williams (R)
 . Edward E. Denison (R)

Indiana 
 . Harry E. Rowbottom (R)
 . Arthur H. Greenwood (D)
 . Frank Gardner (D)
 . Harry C. Canfield (D)
 . Noble J. Johnson (R)
 . Richard N. Elliott (R)
 . Ralph E. Updike (R)
 . Albert H. Vestal (R)
 . Fred S. Purnell (R)
 . William R. Wood (R)
 . Albert R. Hall (R)
 . David Hogg (R)
 . Andrew J. Hickey (R)

Iowa 
 . William F. Kopp (R)
 . F. Dickinson Letts (R)
 . Thomas J. B. Robinson (R)
 . Gilbert N. Haugen (R)
 . Cyrenus Cole (R)
 . C. William Ramseyer (R)
 . Cassius C. Dowell (R)
 . Lloyd Thurston (R)
 . William R. Green (R)
 . Lester J. Dickinson (R)
 . William D. Boies (R)

Kansas 
 . Daniel R. Anthony Jr. (R)
 . Chauncey B. Little (D)
 . William H. Sproul (R)
 . Homer Hoch (R)
 . James G. Strong (R)
 . Hays B. White (R)
 . Jasper N. Tincher (R)
 . William A. Ayres (D)

Kentucky 
 . Alben W. Barkley (D)
 . David H. Kincheloe (D)
 . Robert Y. Thomas Jr. (D), until September 3, 1925
 John W. Moore (D), from December 26, 1925
 . Ben Johnson (D)
 . Maurice Thatcher (R)
 . Arthur B. Rouse (D)
 . Virgil Chapman (D)
 . Ralph W. E. Gilbert (D)
 . Fred M. Vinson (D)
 . John W. Langley (R), until January 11, 1926
 Andrew J. Kirk (R), from February 13, 1926
 . John M. Robsion (R)

Louisiana 
 . James O'Connor (D)
 . James Z. Spearing (D)
 . Whitmell P. Martin (D)
 . John N. Sandlin (D)
 . Riley J. Wilson (D)
 . Bolivar E. Kemp (D)
 . Ladislas Lazaro (D)
 . James B. Aswell (D)

Maine 
 . Carroll L. Beedy (R)
 . Wallace H. White Jr. (R)
 . John E. Nelson (R)
 . Ira G. Hersey (R)

Maryland 
 . T. Alan Goldsborough (D)
 . Millard Tydings (D)
 . John Philip Hill (R)
 . J. Charles Linthicum (D)
 . Stephen W. Gambrill (D)
 . Frederick N. Zihlman (R)

Massachusetts 
 . Allen T. Treadway (R)
 . George B. Churchill (R), until July 1, 1925
 Henry L. Bowles (R), from September 29, 1925
 . Frank H. Foss (R)
 . George R. Stobbs (R)
 . John Jacob Rogers (R), until March 28, 1925
 Edith Nourse Rogers (R), from June 30, 1925
 . Abram Andrew (R)
 . William P. Connery Jr. (D)
 . Harry I. Thayer (R), until March 10, 1926
 Frederick W. Dallinger (R), from November 2, 1926
 . Charles L. Underhill (R)
 . John J. Douglass (D)
 . George Holden Tinkham (R)
 . James A. Gallivan (D)
 . Robert Luce (R)
 . Louis A. Frothingham (R)
 . Joseph W. Martin Jr. (R)
 . Charles L. Gifford (R)

Michigan 
 . John B. Sosnowski (R)
 . Earl C. Michener (R)
 . Arthur B. Williams (R), until May 1, 1925
 Joseph L. Hooper (R), from August 18, 1925
 . John C. Ketcham (R)
 . Carl E. Mapes (R)
 . Grant M. Hudson (R)
 . Louis C. Cramton (R)
 . Bird J. Vincent (R)
 . James C. McLaughlin (R)
 . Roy O. Woodruff (R)
 . Frank D. Scott (R)
 . W. Frank James (R)
 . Clarence J. McLeod (R)

Minnesota 
 . Allen J. Furlow (R)
 . Frank Clague (R)
 . August H. Andresen (R)
 . Oscar Keller (R)
 . Walter Newton (R)
 . Harold Knutson (R)
 . Ole J. Kvale (FL)
 . William L. Carss (FL)
 . Knud Wefald (FL)
 . Godfrey G. Goodwin (R)

Mississippi 
 . John E. Rankin (D)
 . Bill G. Lowrey (D)
 . William M. Whittington (D)
 . T. Jeff Busby (D)
 . Ross A. Collins (D)
 . T. Webber Wilson (D)
 . Percy Quin (D)
 . James Collier (D)

Missouri 
 . Milton A. Romjue (D)
 . Ralph F. Lozier (D)
 . Jacob L. Milligan (D)
 . Charles L. Faust (R)
 . Edgar C. Ellis (R)
 . Clement C. Dickinson (D)
 . Samuel C. Major (D)
 . William L. Nelson (D)
 . Clarence Cannon (D)
 . Cleveland A. Newton (R)
 . Harry B. Hawes (D), until October 15, 1926
 John J. Cochran (D), from November 2, 1926
 . Leonidas C. Dyer (R)
 . Charles E. Kiefner (R)
 . Ralph E. Bailey (R)
 . Joe J. Manlove (R)
 . Thomas L. Rubey (D)

Montana 
 . John M. Evans (D)
 . Scott Leavitt (R)

Nebraska 
 . John H. Morehead (D)
 . Willis G. Sears (R)
 . Edgar Howard (D)
 . Melvin O. McLaughlin (R)
 . Ashton C. Shallenberger (D)
 . Robert G. Simmons (R)

Nevada 
 . Samuel S. Arentz (R)

New Hampshire 
 . Fletcher Hale (R)
 . Edward H. Wason (R)

New Jersey 
 . Francis F. Patterson Jr. (R)
 . Isaac Bacharach (R)
 . Stewart H. Appleby (R), from November 3, 1925
 . Charles A. Eaton (R)
 . Ernest R. Ackerman (R)
 . Randolph Perkins (R)
 . George N. Seger (R)
 . Herbert W. Taylor (R)
 . Franklin W. Fort (R)
 . Frederick R. Lehlbach (R)
 . Oscar L. Auf der Heide (D)
 . Mary T. Norton (D)

New Mexico 
 . John Morrow (D)

New York 
 . Robert L. Bacon (R)
 . John J. Kindred (D)
 . George W. Lindsay (D)
 . Thomas H. Cullen (D)
 . Loring M. Black Jr. (D)
 . Andrew L. Somers (D)
 . John Quayle (D)
 . William E. Cleary (D)
 . David J. O'Connell (D)
 . Emanuel Celler (D)
 . Anning S. Prall (D)
 . Samuel Dickstein (D)
 . Christopher D. Sullivan (D)
 . Nathan D. Perlman (R)
 . John J. Boylan (D)
 . John J. O'Connor (D)
 . Ogden L. Mills (R)
 . John F. Carew (D)
 . Sol Bloom (D)
 . Fiorello H. LaGuardia (R)
 . Royal H. Weller (D)
 . Anthony J. Griffin (D)
 . Frank Oliver (D)
 . Benjamin L. Fairchild (R)
 . J. Mayhew Wainwright (R)
 . Hamilton Fish Jr. (R)
 . Harcourt J. Pratt (R)
 . Parker Corning (D)
 . James S. Parker (R)
 . Frank Crowther (R)
 . Bertrand Snell (R)
 . Thaddeus C. Sweet (R)
 . Frederick M. Davenport (R)
 . Harold S. Tolley (R)
 . Walter W. Magee (R)
 . John Taber (R)
 . Gale H. Stalker (R)
 . Meyer Jacobstein (D)
 . Archie D. Sanders (R)
 . S. Wallace Dempsey (R)
 . Clarence MacGregor (R)
 . James M. Mead (D)
 . Daniel A. Reed (R)

North Carolina 
 . Lindsay C. Warren (D)
 . John H. Kerr (D)
 . Charles L. Abernethy (D)
 . Edward W. Pou (D)
 . Charles M. Stedman (D)
 . Homer L. Lyon (D)
 . William C. Hammer (D)
 . Robert L. Doughton (D)
 . Alfred L. Bulwinkle (D)
 . Zebulon Weaver (D)

North Dakota 
 . Olger B. Burtness (R)
 . Thomas Hall (R)
 . James H. Sinclair (R)

Ohio 
 . Nicholas Longworth (R)
 . Ambrose E.B. Stephens (R), until February 12, 1927
 . Roy G. Fitzgerald (R)
 . William T. Fitzgerald (R)
 . Charles J. Thompson (R)
 . Charles C. Kearns (R)
 . Charles Brand (R)
 . T. Brooks Fletcher (D)
 . William W. Chalmers (R)
 . Thomas A. Jenkins (R)
 . Mell G. Underwood (D)
 . John C. Speaks (R)
 . James T. Begg (R)
 . Martin L. Davey (D)
 . C. Ellis Moore (R)
 . John McSweeney (D)
 . William M. Morgan (R)
 . B. Frank Murphy (R)
 . John G. Cooper (R)
 . Charles A. Mooney (D)
 . Robert Crosser (D)
 . Theodore E. Burton (R)

Oklahoma 
 . Samuel J. Montgomery (R)
 . William W. Hastings (D)
 . Charles D. Carter (D)
 . Tom D. McKeown (D)
 . Fletcher B. Swank (D)
 . Elmer Thomas (D)
 . James V. McClintic (D)
 . Milton C. Garber (R)

Oregon 
 . Willis C. Hawley (R)
 . Nicholas J. Sinnott (R)
 . Maurice E. Crumpacker (R)

Pennsylvania 
 . William S. Vare (R)
 . George S. Graham (R)
 . Harry C. Ransley (R)
 . Benjamin M. Golder (R)
 . James J. Connolly (R)
 . George A. Welsh (R)
 . George P. Darrow (R)
 . Thomas S. Butler (R)
 . Henry W. Watson (R)
 . William W. Griest (R)
 . Laurence H. Watres (R)
 . Edmund N. Carpenter (R)
 . George F. Brumm (R)
 . Charles J. Esterly (R)
 . Louis T. McFadden (R)
 . Edgar R. Kiess (R)
 . Frederick W. Magrady (R)
 . Edward M. Beers (R)
 . Joshua W. Swartz (R)
 . Anderson H. Walters (R)
 . J. Banks Kurtz (R)
 . Franklin Menges (R)
 . William I. Swoope (R)
 . Samuel A. Kendall (R)
 . Henry W. Temple (R)
 . Thomas W. Phillips Jr. (R)
 . Nathan L. Strong (R)
 . Harris J. Bixler (R)
 . Milton W. Shreve (R)
 . William R. Coyle (R)
 . Adam M. Wyant (R)
 . Stephen G. Porter (R)
 . M. Clyde Kelly (R)
 . John M. Morin (R)
 . James M. Magee (R)
 . Guy E. Campbell (R)

Rhode Island 
 . Clark Burdick (R)
 . Richard S. Aldrich (R)
 . Jeremiah E. O'Connell (D)

South Carolina 
 . Thomas S. McMillan (D)
 . Butler B. Hare (D)
 . Frederick H. Dominick (D)
 . John J. McSwain (D)
 . William F. Stevenson (D)
 . Allard H. Gasque (D)
 . Hampton P. Fulmer (D)

South Dakota 
 . Charles A. Christopherson (R)
 . Royal C. Johnson (R)
 . William Williamson (R)

Tennessee 
 . B. Carroll Reece (R)
 . J. Will Taylor (R)
 . Sam D. McReynolds (D)
 . Cordell Hull (D)
 . Ewin L. Davis (D)
 . Joseph W. Byrns Sr. (D)
 . Edward E. Eslick (D)
 . Gordon Browning (D)
 . Finis J. Garrett (D)
 . Hubert Fisher (D)

Texas 
 . Eugene Black (D)
 . John C. Box (D)
 . Morgan G. Sanders (D)
 . Sam Rayburn (D)
 . Hatton W. Sumners (D)
 . Luther Alexander Johnson (D)
 . Clay Stone Briggs (D)
 . Daniel E. Garrett (D)
 . Joseph J. Mansfield (D)
 . James P. Buchanan (D)
 . Tom Connally (D)
 . Fritz G. Lanham (D)
 . Guinn Williams (D)
 . Harry M. Wurzbach (R)
 . John N. Garner (D)
 . Claude B. Hudspeth (D)
 . Thomas L. Blanton (D)
 . J. Marvin Jones (D)

Utah 
 . Don B. Colton (R)
 . Elmer O. Leatherwood (R)

Vermont 
 . Elbert S. Brigham (R)
 . Ernest Willard Gibson (R)

Virginia 
 . S. Otis Bland (D)
 . Joseph T. Deal (D)
 . Andrew J. Montague (D)
 . Patrick H. Drewry (D)
 . Joseph Whitehead (D)
 . Clifton A. Woodrum (D)
 . Thomas W. Harrison (D)
 . R. Walton Moore (D)
 . George C. Peery (D)
 . Henry St. George Tucker III (D)

Washington 
 . John F. Miller (R)
 . Lindley H. Hadley (R)
 . Albert Johnson (R)
 . John W. Summers (R)
 . Samuel B. Hill (D)

West Virginia 
 . Carl G. Bachmann (R)
 . Frank L. Bowman (R)
 . John M. Wolverton (R)
 . Harry C. Woodyard (R)
 . James F. Strother (R)
 . J. Alfred Taylor (D)

Wisconsin 
 . Henry A. Cooper (R)
 . Edward Voigt (R)
 . John M. Nelson (R)
 . John C. Schafer (R)
 . Victor L. Berger (S)
 . Florian Lampert (R)
 . Joseph D. Beck (R)
 . Edward E. Browne (R)
 . George J. Schneider (R)
 . James A. Frear (R)
 . Hubert H. Peavey (R)

Wyoming 
 . Charles E. Winter (R)

Non-voting members
 . Daniel Sutherland (R)
 . William P. Jarrett (D)
 . Isauro Gabaldon (Nac.)
 . Pedro Guevara (Nac.)
 . Félix Córdova Dávila (UPR)

Changes in membership 
The count below reflects changes from the beginning of the first session of this Congress.

Senate 
 Replacements: 10
 Democratic: 2 net gain
 Republican: 3 net loss
 Deaths: 7
 Resignations: 0
 Contested election: 1
 Interim appointments: 2
Total seats with changes: 9

House of Representatives 
 Replacements: 9
 Democratic: 1 seat net loss
 Republican: 1 seat net gain
 Deaths: 9
 Resignations: 2
Total seats with changes: 12

Committees

Senate

 Agriculture and Forestry  (Chairman: George W. Norris; Ranking Member: Ellison D. Smith)
 Alien Property Custodian's Office (Select)
 Appropriations (Chairman: Francis E. Warren; Ranking Member: Lee S. Overman)
 Audit and Control the Contingent Expenses of the Senate (Chairman: Henry W. Keyes; Ranking Member: Kenneth McKellar)
 Banking and Currency (Chairman: George P. McLean; Ranking Member: Duncan U. Fletcher)
 Civil Service (Chairman: James Couzens then Porter H. Dale; Ranking Member: Kenneth McKellar)
 Claims (Chairman: Rice W. Means; Ranking Member: Park Trammell)
 Commerce (Chairman: Wesley L. Jones; Ranking Member: Duncan U. Fletcher)
 District of Columbia (Chairman: Arthur Capper; Ranking Member: William H. King)
 Education and Labor (Chairman: Lawrence C. Phipps; Ranking Member: Andrieus A. Jones)
 Enrolled Bills (Chairman: Frank L. Greene; Ranking Member: Coleman L. Blease)
 Expenditures in Executive Departments (Chairman: David A. Reed; Ranking Member: Oscar W. Underwood)
 Finance (Chairman: Reed Smoot; Ranking Member: Furnifold M. Simmons)
 Foreign Relations (Chairman: William E. Borah; Ranking Member: Claude Swanson)
 Immigration (Chairman: Hiram W. Johnson; Ranking Member: William H. King)
 Indian Affairs (Chairman: John W. Harreld; Ranking Member: Henry F. Ashurst)
 Internal Revenue Bureau (Select)
 Interoceanic Canals (Chairman: Walter Evans Edge; Ranking Member: Thomas J. Walsh)
 Interstate Commerce (Chairman: James Eli Watson; Ranking Member: Ellison D. Smith)
 Irrigation and Reclamation (Chairman: Charles L. McNary; Ranking Member: Morris Sheppard)
 Judiciary (Chairman: Albert B. Cummins; Ranking Member: Lee S. Overman)
 Library (Chairman: Simeon D. Fess; Ranking Member: Kenneth McKellar)
 Manufactures (Chairman: William B. McKinley; Ranking Member: Ellison D. Smith)
 Military Affairs (Chairman: James W. Wadsworth Jr.; Ranking Member: Duncan U. Fletcher)
 Mines and Mining (Chairman: Tasker L. Oddie; Ranking Member: Thomas J. Walsh)
 Naval Affairs (Chairman: Frederick Hale; Ranking Member: Claude A. Swanson)
 Patents (Chairman: William M. Butler; Ranking Member: Ellison D. Smith)
 Pensions (Chairman: Peter Norbeck; Ranking Member: Peter G. Gerry)
 Post Office and Post Roads (Chairman: George H. Moses; Ranking Member: Kenneth McKellar)
 Printing (Chairman: George W. Pepper; Ranking Member: Duncan U. Fletcher)
 Privileges and Elections (Chairman: Richard P. Ernst; Ranking Member: William H. King)
 Public Buildings and Grounds (Chairman: Bert M. Fernald; Ranking Member: James A. Reed)
 Public Lands and Surveys (Chairman: Robert Nelson Stanfield; Ranking Member: Key Pittman)
 Rules (Chairman: Charles Curtis; Ranking Member: Lee S. Overman)
 Senatorial Elections (Select)
 Tariff Commission (Select)
 Territories and Insular Possessions (Chairman: Frank B. Willis; Ranking Member: Key Pittman)
 War Finance Corporation Loans (Select)
 Whole

House of Representatives

 Accounts (Chairman: Clarence MacGregor; Ranking Member: Ralph Waldo Emerson Gilbert)
 Agriculture (Chairman: Gilbert N. Haugen; Ranking Member: James B. Aswell)
 Alcoholic Liquor Traffic (Chairman: Grant M. Hudson; Ranking Member: William D. Upshaw)
 Appropriations  (Chairman: Martin B. Madden; Ranking Member: Joseph W. Byrns)
 Banking and Currency (Chairman: Louis T. McFadden; Ranking Member: Otis Wingo)
 Census (Chairman: E. Hart Fenn; Ranking Member: John E. Rankin)
 Civil Service (Chairman: Frederick R. Lehlbach; Ranking Member: Lamar Jeffers)
 Claims (Chairman: Charles L. Underhill; Ranking Member: John C. Box)
 Coinage, Weights and Measures (Chairman: Randolph Perkins; Ranking Member: Bill G. Lowrey)
 Disposition of Executive Papers (Chairman: Edward H. Wason; Ranking Member: Arthur B. Rouse)
 District of Columbia (Chairman: Frederick N. Zihlman; Ranking Member: Christopher D. Sullivan)
 Education (Chairman: Daniel A. Reed; Ranking Member: Bill G. Lowrey)
 Election of the President, Vice President and Representatives in Congress (Chairman: Hays B. White; Ranking Member: Lamar Jeffers)
 Elections No.#1 (Chairman: Don B. Colton; Ranking Member: C.B. Hudspeth)
 Elections No.#2 (Chairman: Bird J. Vincent; Ranking Member: Gordon Browning)
 Elections No.#3 (Chairman: Charles L. Gifford; Ranking Member: Guinn Williams)
 Enrolled Bills (Chairman: Guy E. Campbell; Ranking Member: Thomas L. Blanton)
 Expenditures in the Agriculture Department (Chairman: Edward J. King; Ranking Member: Frank Gardner)
 Expenditures in the Commerce Department (Chairman: Henry R. Rathbone; Ranking Member: Miles C. Allgood)
 Expenditures in the Interior Department (Chairman: William Williamson; Ranking Member: Sol Bloom)
 Expenditures in the Justice Department (Chairman: Willis G. Sears; Ranking Member: Frank Oliver)
 Expenditures in the Labor Department (Chairman: Carroll L. Beedy; Ranking Member: Thomas L. Blanton)
 Expenditures in the Navy Department (Chairman: George F. Brumm; Ranking Member: Charles L. Abernethy)
 Expenditures in the Post Office Department (Chairman: Philip D. Swing; Ranking Member: Guinn Williams)
 Expenditures in the State Department (Chairman: J. Will Taylor; Ranking Member: George C. Peery)
 Expenditures in the Treasury Department (Chairman: Ernest W. Gibson; Ranking Member: Heartsill Ragon)
 Expenditures in the War Department (Chairman: Thaddeus C. Sweet; Ranking Member: Arthur H. Greenwood)
 Expenditures on Public Buildings (Chairman: Elmer O. Leatherwood; Ranking Member: Samuel Dickstein)
 Flood Control (Chairman: Frank R. Reid; Ranking Member: Riley J. Wilson)
 Foreign Affairs (Chairman: Stephen G. Porter; Ranking Member: J. Charles Linthicum)
 Immigration and Naturalization (Chairman: Albert Johnson; Ranking Member: Adolph J. Sabath)
 Indian Affairs (Chairman: John W. Harreld; Ranking Member: Carl Hayden)
 Industrial Arts and Expositions (Chairman: George A. Welsh; Ranking Member: Fritz G. Lanham)
 Inquiry into Operation of the United States Air Services (Select) (Chairman: N/A)
 Insular Affairs (Chairman: Scott Leavitt; Ranking Member: Mell G. Underwood)
 Interstate and Foreign Commerce (Chairman: James S. Parker; Ranking Member: Alben W. Barkley)
 Invalid Pensions (Chairman: Charles E. Fuller; Ranking Member: Mell G. Underwood)
 Irrigation and Reclamation (Chairman: Addison T. Smith; Ranking Member: Carl Hayden)
 Judiciary (Chairman: George S. Graham; Ranking Member: Hatton W. Sumners)
 Labor (Chairman: William F. Kopp; Ranking Member: William D. Upshaw)
 Library (Chairman: Robert Luce; Ranking Member: Ralph Waldo Emerson Gilbert)
 Merchant Marine and Fisheries (Chairman: Frank D. Scott; Ranking Member: Ladislas Lazaro)
 Mileage (Chairman: Carroll L. Beedy; Ranking Member: John W. Moore)
 Military Affairs (Chairman: John M. Morin; Ranking Member: Percy E. Quin)
 Mines and Mining (Chairman: John M. Robsion; Ranking Member: Daniel Sutherland)
 Naval Affairs (Chairman: Thomas S. Butler; Ranking Member: Carl Vinson)
 Patents (Chairman: Albert H. Vestal; Ranking Member: Fritz G. Lanham)
 Pensions (Chairman: Harold Knutson; Ranking Member: William D. Upshaw)
 Post Office and Post Roads (Chairman: William W. Griest; Ranking Member: Thomas M. Bell)
 Printing (Chairman: Edward M. Beers; Ranking Member: William F. Stevenson)
 Public Buildings and Grounds (Chairman: Richard N. Elliott; Ranking Member: Fritz G. Lanham)
 Public Lands (Chairman: Nicholas J. Sinnott; Ranking Member: John E. Raker then John M. Evans)
 Railways and Canals (Chairman: Oscar E. Keller; Ranking Member: William C. Lankford)
 Revision of Laws (Chairman: Roy G. Fitzgerald; Ranking Member: Alfred L. Bulwinkle)
 Rivers and Harbors (Chairman: S. Wallace Dempsey; Ranking Member: Joseph J. Mansfield)
 Roads (Chairman: Cassius C. Dowell; Ranking Member: Edward B. Almon)
 Rules (Chairman: Bertrand H. Snell; Ranking Member: Edward W. Pou) 
 Standards of Official Conduct
 Territories (Chairman: Charles F. Curry; Ranking Member: William C. Lankford)
 War Claims (Chairman: James G. Strong; Ranking Member: Bill G. Lowrey)
 Ways and Means (Chairman: William R. Green; Ranking Member: John N. Garner)
 Woman Suffrage (Chairman: Wallace H. White Jr.; Ranking Member: John E. Raker then Christopher D. Sullivan)
 World War Veterans' Legislation (Chairman: Royal C. Johnson; Ranking Member: Carl Hayden)
 Whole

Joint committees

 Civil Service Retirement Act
 Conditions of Indian Tribes (Special)
 Disposition of (Useless) Executive Papers
 Determine what Employment may be Furnished Federal Prisoners (Chairman: Rep. George S. Graham)
 Investigation of Northern Pacific Railroad Land Grants (Chairman: Rep. Nicholas J. Sinnott)
 Muscle Shoals
 The Library (Chairman: Sen. Simeon D. Fess)
 Printing (Chairman: Sen. George H. Moses; Vice Chairman: Rep. Edgar R. Kiess)
 Taxation (Chairman: Rep. William R. Green)

Caucuses
 Democratic (House)
 Democratic (Senate)

Employees

Legislative branch agency directors 
 Architect of the Capitol: David Lynn
 Comptroller General of the United States: John R. McCarl
 Librarian of Congress: Herbert Putnam 
 Public Printer of the United States: George H. Carter

Senate 
 Chaplain: John J. Muir (Baptist)
 Secretary: George A. Sanderson, until December 7, 1925
 Edwin P. Thayer, from December 7, 1925
 Librarian: Edward C. Goodwin
 Sergeant at Arms: David S. Barry

House of Representatives 
 Chaplain: James S. Montgomery (Methodist)
 Clerk: William T. Page 
 Clerk at the Speaker's Table: Lehr Fess, resigned February 1, 1927
 Lewis Deschler, appointed February 1, 1927
 Doorkeeper: Bert W. Kennedy
 Reading Clerks: Patrick Joseph Haltigan (D) and Alney E. Chaffee (R)
 Postmaster: Frank W. Collier
 Sergeant at Arms: Joseph G. Rodgers

See also 
 1924 United States elections (elections leading to this Congress)
 1924 United States presidential election
 1924 United States Senate elections
 1924 United States House of Representatives elections
 1926 United States elections (elections during this Congress, leading to the next Congress)
 1926 United States Senate elections
 1926 United States House of Representatives elections

References

External links
 Biographical Directory of the U.S. Congress
 U.S. House of Representatives: House History
 U.S. Senate: Statistics and Lists